Isglem (established 1987 in Bergen, Norway) is a Norwegian musical duo comprising Karl Seglem and Terje Isungset. Their traditional music and free jazz-based expression involves an unusual amount of improvisation and has given the pairing a pioneer stamp. They have released four albums on the NorCD label and performed at Nattjazz in 1991, 1992 and 1993. Isglem toured Ireland with Mark O'Leary in  2002. They have several national tours under the auspices of Rikskonsertene.

Band members 
Terje Isungset - percussion and mouth harp
Karl Seglem - saxophone and bukkehorn

Discography 
1991: Rom (NorCD), recorded at Lien Grendehus at Geilo
1992: To steg (NorCD)
1996: Null G (NorCD)
2003: Fire (NorCD)
2016: 5te (NorCD)

References

External links 
Fire Review - Puls.no

NorCD artists
Norwegian jazz ensembles
Norwegian experimental musical groups
Musical groups established in 1987
Musical groups from Bergen